Free fall is any motion of a body when gravity is the only force acting upon it.

Free fall, Free-fall, or Freefall may also refer to:

Books
 Freefall, a character in the Gen¹³ comic book
 Freefall (G.I. Joe), a fictional character in the G.I. Joe universe
 Free Fall (Golding novel), a 1959 novel by William G. Golding
 Freefall (novel), the third book of the Tunnels series, by Roderick Gordon and Brian Williams
 Freefall: America, Free Markets, and the Sinking of the World Economy, a 2010 non-fiction book by Joseph Stiglitz
 Freefall, an autobiographical work of non-fiction by Charles "Nish" Bruce under the pseudonym Tom Read
 Free Fall, a crime novel in the Elvis Cole series, by Robert Crais
 Free Fall, a novel by Kyle Mills
 Freefall, a science fiction novel by Judith and Garfield Reeves-Stevens
 Freefall, a webcomic by Mark Stanley (1998-)

Film and TV

Films
 Freefall (1994 film), 1994 film directed by John Irvin
 Free Fall (1999 film), 1999 film written by Ken Wheat
 Freefall (2009 film), 2009 BBC television film written and directed by Dominic Savage
 Free Fall (2009 film), a Canadian drama film directed by Mariloup Wolfe
 Free Fall (2013 film), English title of the 2013 German film Freier Fall
 Free Fall (2014 American film), an American crime thriller film
 Free Fall (2014 Hungarian film), a Hungarian film
 Freefall: Flight 174, a 1995 Canadian thriller film

Television
 "Free Fall" (CSI: Miami), an episode of CSI: Miami
 "Free Fall" (Ghost Whisperer), an episode of Ghost Whisperer
 "Freefall" (Miami Vice), title of the two-hour final episode of the television series Miami Vice
 "Free Fall" (Pretty Little Liars), a 2014 episode of the television series Pretty Little Liars
 "Freefall" (The Unit), an episode of the television series The Unit
 "Free Fall" (The Wall), the first round of the American game show The Wall

Games
 Free Fall Associates, a computer game programming company
 Freefall (ride), a type of theme park ride
 Frozen Free Fall, a Disney mobile game based on the Frozen movies

Music

Albums and EPs
 Free Fall (Jesse Cook album), the fourth album, in 2000, by the New Flamenco artist Jesse Cook
 Free Fall (Dixie Dregs album), a 1977 album by Dixie Dregs
 Free Fall (Jimmy Giuffre album), a 1963 album by jazz musician Jimmy Giuffre
 Free Fall (Magnus Karlsson album), a 2013 album by Magnus Karlsson
 Free Fall (Alvin Lee Band album), a 1980 album by the Alvin Lee Band
 Freefall (album), a 2002 album by Kenny Barron and Regina Carter
 Freefall (EP), a 1990 EP by Chapterhouse

Songs
 "Free Fall", a song by Born of Osiris from the album Soul Sphere
 "Free Fall", a song by Hawkwind (as Hawklords) from the album 25 Years On
 "Free Fall", a song by Illenium from Awake
 "Free Fall", a song by In Flames from the album Reroute to Remain
 "Freefall", a song on Camel's album, Mirage
 "Freefall", a song by Fixmer/McCarthy from A Bugged Out Mix
 "Freefall", a song by Northlane from the album Alien
 "Freefallin", a 2010 song by Zoe Badwi
 "Free Fallin'", a 1989 song by Tom Petty

Other
 The part of a parachute jump, before the parachute opens